Uzbekistan competed in the Winter Olympic Games as an independent nation for the first time at the 1994 Winter Olympics in Lillehammer, Norway.   Previously, Uzbek athletes competed for the Unified Team at the 1992 Winter Olympics.

Medalists

Competitors
The following is the list of number of competitors in the Games.

Figure skating

Ice Dancing

Freestyle skiing

Men

Women

References

Sources
Official Olympic Reports
International Olympic Committee results database
sports-reference

Nations at the 1994 Winter Olympics
1994
Winter Olympics